Tsing Chau Tsai Peninsula is the peninsula located at the northeast of Lantau Island, New Territories, Hong Kong, including Yam O, To Kau Wan, Tai Tsing Chau, Tsing Chau Tsai and Penny's Bay.

Administration
Tsing Chau Tsai Peninsula administratively belongs to Tsuen Wan District, while the remaining areas of Lantau Island belong to Islands District. It is an exclave and it is only connected by Kap Shui Mun Bridge with other part of Tsuen Wan District, like Ma Wan.

Features
A few areas in there have been developed. Sunny Bay station is constructed at the reclaimed land of Yam O to act as an interchange between Tung Chung line and Disneyland Resort line of MTR. Hong Kong Disneyland Resort is built at the reclaimed land of Penny's Bay, formerly the shipyard area. According to the Northeast Lantau Outline Zoning Plan issued by the Hong Kong SAR Government, Container Terminal 10 and 11 may be built in the south of the peninsula.

Villages
Tsing Chau Tsai Peninsula is or was the location of several villages, including:
 Fa Peng
 Luk Keng Village
 Pa Tau Kwu
 Ta Pang Po
 Tai Chuen
 Tso Wan

References

External links

 Delineation of area of existing village Fa Peng, Tso Wan and Tai Chuen (Ma Wan) for election of resident representative (2019 to 2022)

Lantau Island
Tsuen Wan District
Peninsulas of Hong Kong